The following outline is provided as an overview of and topical guide to Turkey:

Turkey – sovereign Eurasian country that stretches across the Anatolian peninsula in Southwest Asia and Thrace (Rumelia) at the southeastern tip of the Balkan Peninsula in Southern Europe. Turkey is a democratic, secular, unitary, constitutional republic whose political system was established in 1923 under the leadership of Mustafa Kemal Atatürk, following the fall of the Ottoman Empire in the aftermath of World War I.

General reference

 Pronunciation: 
 Common English country name:  Turkey
 Official English country name:  The Republic of Turkiye
 Common endonym(s), i.e., in 
 Official endonym(s):  
 Adjectival(s): Turkish
 Demonym(s): Turks (in Turkish language: Türkler)
 Etymology: Name of Turkey
 International rankings of Turkey
 ISO country codes:  TR, TUR, 792
 ISO region codes:  See ISO 3166-2:TR
 Internet country code top-level domain:  .tr

Geography of Turkey

 Turkey is: a country
 Location:
Northern Hemisphere and Eastern Hemisphere 
Asia (except Thrace)
Southwest Asia
Europe
Southeast Europe
Time zone
Turkey Standard Time (UTC+03:00), since 2016
Eastern European Time (UTC+02:00) Eastern Daylight Time (UTC+03:00), until 2016. 
 Extreme points of Turkey
 High:  Mount Ararat 
 Low:  Mediterranean Sea and Black Sea 0 m
 Land boundaries:  2,648 km (1645 mi)
 (outline) 822 km (511 mi)
 (outline) 499 km (511 mi)
 (outline) 352 km (310 mi)
 (outline) 268 km (167 mi)
 (outline) 252 km (157 mi)
 (outline) 240 km (149 mi)
 (outline) 206 km (5128 mi)
 (outline) 9 km (6 mi)
Coastline: 7,200 km (4,474 mi)
 Population of Turkey:  82 million 19th most populous country
 Area of Turkey: 783,562 km2 (302,455 sq mi) 36th most extensive country
 Atlas of Turkey 
 Cities of Turkey, by population

Environment of Turkey

 

 Climate of Turkey
Climate change in Turkey
 Environmental issues in Turkey
 Ecoregions in Turkey
 Renewable energy in Turkey
 Geothermal power in Turkey
 Solar power in Turkey
 Wind power in Turkey
 Geology of Turkey
Earthquakes in Turkey
National parks of Turkey
Protected areas of Turkey
 Wildlife of Turkey
 Flora of Turkey
 Fauna of Turkey
 Amphibians of Turkey
 Birds of Turkey
 Mammals of Turkey
 Reptiles of Turkey

Geographic features of Turkey

Glaciers of Turkey
 Islands of Turkey
 Lakes of Turkey
Mountain peaks of Turkey
 Highest major summits of Turkey
 Most prominent summits of Turkey
 Most isolated major summits of Turkey
 Anti-Taurus Mountains
 Pontic Mountains 
 Sultan Mountains 
 Taurus Mountains 
 Yalnızçam Mountains 
 Yıldız Mountains 
 Volcanoes of Turkey
 Rivers of Turkey
Büyük Menderes River
Euphrates
Kızılırmak
Meriç
Sakarya River
Tigris
 Waterfalls of Turkey
 Valleys of Turkey
 World Heritage Sites in Turkey

Regions of Turkey

Aegean Region
Black Sea Region
Central Anatolia Region
Eastern Anatolia Region
Marmara Region
Mediterranean Region
Southeastern Anatolia Region

Ecoregions of Turkey

List of ecoregions in Turkey
 Ecoregions in Turkey

Administrative divisions of Turkey
Administrative divisions of Turkey 
 Provinces of Turkey
 Districts of Turkey
 Cities of Turkey

Provinces of Turkey

Provinces of Turkey
Turkey is divided into 81 provinces, called iller in Turkish

Districts of Turkey

Districts of Turkey
The provinces of Turkey are divided into 923 districts (ilçeler; sing. ilçe).

Demography of Turkey

Demographics of Turkey
 Census in Turkey

Government and politics of Turkey

 Form of government: Unitary presidential constitutional republic
 Capital of Turkey: Ankara
Flag of Turkey
 Elections in Turkey
Voting rights in Turkey
 Political parties in Turkey
Justice and Development Party (AKP)
Republican People's Party (CHP)
Peoples' Democratic Party (HDP)
Nationalist Movement Party (MHP)
Good Party
Worker's Party
Democracy and Progress Party
Communist Party
Green Party
Future Party
Political divisions of Turkey

National government

Constitution of Turkey

Legislative branch

 Parliament of Turkey
 Speaker of the Grand National Assembly

Executive branch

 Head of state and Head of government: President of Turkey, Recep Tayyip Erdoğan (12th)
 Vice President of Turkey: Fuat Oktay (1st)
 Cabinet of Turkey

Judicial branch

 Turkey national courts
 Constitutional Court of Turkey
 Chief Justice of Turkey
 High Court of Appeals of Turkey
 Supreme Council of Public Accounts
 Court of Jurisdictional Disputes

Foreign relations

Foreign policy of Turkey

International organization membership

Member state of the Group of Twenty (G20)
Member state of Council of Europe
Member state of the North Atlantic Treaty Organization
Member state of the Organization of Islamic Cooperation
Member state of the Organization for Economic Co-operation and Development
Member state of the United Nations
 Member state of the Turkic Council

Military

Turkish Army
Turkish Gendarmerie
Turkish Air Force
Turkish Coast Guard

Intelligence organizations
 National Intelligence Organization (MİT)
 KDGM
 General Staff of the Turkish Armed Forces
 Gendarmerie Intelligence Organization

History of Turkey

History of Turkey, by period 
  Ancient period
 Ancient settlements in Turkey
 Ancient kingdoms of Anatolia
 Ottoman Empire
 Rebellions in the Ottoman Empire

History of Turkey, by subject 
 Constitutional history of Turkey
 Economic history of Turkey
 Genetic history of the Turkish people
 History of the Jews in Turkey
 Military history of Turkey
 History of Turkish navies

Culture of Turkey

 
 

 Architecture
 Ottoman architecture
 Cuisine
 Languages
 Adyghe (Circassian)
 Northern Kurdish
 Ladino
 Turkish
 Regional Turkish
 Turkish Sign Language
 Western Armenian
 Media  
Newspapers
Radio stations
Television
 Museums
 Public holidays
 Traditions
 Carpets 
 Folk dances
 Shadow play
 Turkophilia
 Turquerie
 World Heritage Sites in Turkey

Art in Turkey
 Cinema
 Golden Orange Awards
 Turkish actors
 Turkish directors
 Turkish films
 Turkish production companies
 Turkish scriptwriters
 Literature
 Turkish novelists
 List of contemporary Turkish poets
 Turkish short story writers
Museums
 Music
 Classical composers
 Composers
 Theater
 Turkish playwrights
Television
 Television series
Visual arts
 Turkish painters
 Turkish photographers
 Turkish sculpturist

Law in Turkey 

 Constitution of Turkey 
 Separation of church and state in Turkey
 Separation of powers under the Turkish Constitution
 Civil liberties in Turkey
 Abortion in Turkey
 Assisted suicide in Turkey
 Freedom of assembly in Turkey
 Freedom of association in Turkey
 Freedom of information in Turkey
 Freedom of movement under Turkish law
 Freedom of religion in Turkey
 Freedom of speech in Turkey
 LGBT rights in Turkey
 Polygamy in Turkey
 Prostitution in Turkey
 Freedom of the press in Turkey
 Criminal law in Turkey
 Criminal law procedure in Turkey
 Capital punishment in Turkey
 Crime in Turkey
 Crimes against the public
 Sumptuary law in Turkey 
 Alcohol laws of Turkey
 Smoking ban in Turkey
 Crimes against property 
 Bribery in Turkey
 Embezzlement in Turkey
 Gambling in Turkey
 Intellectual property violation
 Tax evasion in Turkey
 Crimes against animals in Turkey
 Animal cruelty laws in Turkey
 Family law in Turkey
 Marriage in Turkey
 Marriageable age
 Dissolution of marriage in Turkey
 No-fault divorce in Turkey
 Child custody laws in Turkey
 Child support in Turkey
 Parenting coordinator in Turkey
 Grandparent visitation rights in Turkey
 Adoption in Turkey
 Surrogacy in Turkey
 Child protective services in Turkey
 Emancipation of minors in Turkey
 Juvenile law in Turkey
 Intellectual property law in Turkey
 World Intellectual Property Organization
 Copyright law in Turkey
 Public domain in Turkey
 Commercial law in Turkey
 Bankruptcy in Turkey
 Consumer protection in Turkey
 Securities regulation in Turkey
 Capital Markets Board of Turkey
 Financial Regulation in Turkey
 Jurisprudence in Turkey
 Judicial review in Turkey
 Practice of law in Turkey
 Law making in Turkey
 Ballot measures in Turkey
 Executive orders in Turkey
 Legislative rulemaking in Turkey
 Treaties of Turkey
 Statutory law
 Acts of Parliament in Turkey
 Law enforcement in Turkey

Religion in Turkey 

 Bahá'í Faith in Turkey
 Buddhism
 Christianity in Turkey
 Catholic Church in Turkey
 Latin rite
 Roman Catholic Archdiocese
 Apostolic Vicariate of Anatolia
 Apostolic Vicariate of Istanbul
 Armenian rite
 Armenian Catholic Archeparchy
 Byzantine rite
 Greek Catholic Exarchate
 West Syriac rite
 Syriac Catholic Exarchate
 Chaldean Catholic
 Chaldean Catholic Archeparchy
 Eastern Orthodoxy in Turkey
 Ecumenical Patriarchate of Constantinople
 Greek Orthodox Church of Antioch
 Turkish Orthodox Patriarchate
 Nestorian Church of the East
 Assyrian Church of the East
 Oriental Orthodoxy
 Armenian Apostolic Church
Protestanism
 Armenian Evangelical Church
 German Evangelical Church
 Greek Evangelical Church
 Anglican Church
 The Church of Jesus Christ of Latter-day Saints
 Islam
 Alevism
 Quranism
Shi’a Islam
 Alawites
 Twelver
 Sufism
 Sunni Islam
 Judaism
 Karaite
 Orthodox
 Hasidic
 Modern Orthodox
 Tengrism
 Yazidism

Sports in Turkey

Sports in Turkey
 Football in Turkey
 Football clubs in Turkey
 Turkey at the Olympics

Economy and infrastructure of Turkey

 Economic rank, by nominal GDP(2021): 20th
 Economic rank, by GDP (PPP) (2021): 11th
 Currency of Turkey: ₺ Turkish lira
 ISO 4217: TRY
Banking in Turkey
 Central Bank
 List of banks in Turkey
 Telecommunications in Turkey
 Internet in Turkey
 Regional Internet Registry for Europe (RIPE NNC)
 Economic history of Turkey
 National debt of Turkey
 Energy in Turkey
 Energy policy of Turkey
 Electricity sector in Turkey
 Coal in Turkey
 
Nuclear energy in Turkey
 Renewable energy in Turkey
 Geothermal power in Turkey
 Solar power in Turkey
 Wind power in Turkey
 Energy conservation in Turkey
 Energy policy of Turkey
 Department of Energy
 Turkish energy law
 Health care in Turkey
 Industry trade groups in Turkey
 Tourism in Turkey
 Shopping malls in Turkey
 Transportation in Turkey
 Air transportation in Turkey
 Airports in Turkey
 Highway system in Turkey
 Rail transport in Turkey
 High-speed rail in Turkey
 History of rail transport in Turkey
 Trade policy of Turkey
 European Union Customs Union
 Organisation for Economic Co-operation and Development
 World Trade Organization
 Wealth in Turkey
 Household income in Turkey
 Income inequality in Turkey
 Personal income in Turkey
 Poverty in Turkey
 Welfare in Turkey
 Water supply and sanitation in Turkey

Education in Turkey

 Higher education in Turkey
 Medical education in Turkey
 Legal education in Turkey
 List of schools in Turkey
 List of private schools in Turkey 
 List of international schools in Turkey
 List of yeshivas in Turkey
 List of public schools in Turkey
 Lists of universities and colleges
 List of law schools in Turkey
 List of medical schools in Turkey
 Anti-schooling activism in Turkey
 Department of Education in Turkey
 Board of education in Turkey
 Compulsory education in Turkey
 Foreign language education in Turkey
 Homeschooling in Turkey

See also 

Topic overview:
Turkey
Index of Turkey-related articles

References

Coal mining in Turkey
Turkey
Turkey